Aemocia ichthyosomoides is a species of beetle in the family Cerambycidae. It was described by James Thomson in 1864. It is known from Moluccas.

References

Mesosini
Beetles described in 1864